Vasil Kušej (born 24 May 2000) is a Czech professional footballer who plays as a forward for FK Mladá Boleslav.

Club career
Born in Ústí nad Labem, at the age of 15, Kušej signed for the youth academy of German second division side Dynamo Dresden.

In 2019, he was sent on loan to Wacker Innsbruck in the Austrian second division.

In 2020, he was sent on loan to Czech second division club Ústí nad Labem.

International career
Kušej has represented the Czech Republic at all U16–U21 levels.

References

External links

2000 births
Living people
Czech footballers
Sportspeople from Ústí nad Labem
Association football forwards
Dynamo Dresden players
FC Wacker Innsbruck (2002) players
FK Ústí nad Labem players
FK Mladá Boleslav players
2. Liga (Austria) players
Czech First League players
Czech National Football League players
Czech Republic youth international footballers
Czech expatriate footballers
Czech expatriate sportspeople in Germany
Czech expatriate sportspeople in Austria
Expatriate footballers in Austria
Expatriate footballers in Germany